William Sinclair MacDonald MBE, DSC (28 August 1911 – 1978) was a Scottish amateur football wing half who played in the Scottish League for Queen's Park and Edinburgh City. He was capped by Scotland at amateur level.

Personal life 
Under his command, German U-boat  was sunk by HMS Marigold on 16 November 1941, for which he was mentioned in dispatches. MacDonald was awarded the Distinguished Service Cross in June 1942 and an MBE in March 1943.

References 

Scottish footballers
Queen's Park F.C. players
Scottish Football League players
Scotland amateur international footballers
Association football wing halves
1911 births
1978 deaths
People from Wick, Caithness
Royal Naval Volunteer Reserve personnel of World War II
Royal Navy officers of World War II
Recipients of the Distinguished Service Cross (United Kingdom)
Members of the Order of the British Empire
Edinburgh City F.C. (1928) players
Date of death unknown